Holmboe is a Scandinavian surname, and may refer to the following.

Norwegian family

 Jens Holmboe (bailiff) (1752–1804), Norwegian bailiff
 Even Hammer Holmboe (1792–1859), Norwegian politician, child of Jens Holmboe
 Hans Holmboe (1798–1868), Norwegian educator and politician, child of Jens Holmboe
 Leonhard Christian Borchgrevink Holmboe (1802–1887), Norwegian priest and politician, child of Jens Holmboe
 Jens Holmboe (politician) (1821–1891), Norwegian politician, grandchild of Jens Holmboe
 Conrad Holmboe (1828–1923), Norwegian businessman, grandchild of Jens Holmboe
 Johan Henrik Rye Holmboe (1863–1933), Norwegian politician, great-grandchild of Jens Holmboe
 Thorolf Holmboe (1866–1935), Norwegian painter, great-grandchild of Jens Holmboe
 Cornelius Holmboe (1881–1947), Norwegian politician, great-grandchild of Jens Holmboe
 Carl Fredrik Holmboe (1882-1960), Norwegian engineer, great-grandchild of Jens Holmboe
 Joachim Holmboe Rønneberg (born 1919), Norwegian resistance fighter and broadcaster, great-great-great-grandchild of Jens Holmboe
 Tone Groven Holmboe (born 1930), Norwegian composer, married a great-great-great-grandchild of Jens Holmboe
 Otto Holmboe (1710–1773), Norwegian priest
 Bernt Michael Holmboe (1795–1850), Norwegian mathematician, grandchild of Otto Holmboe, brother of C.A.
 Christopher Andreas Holmboe (1796–1882), Norwegian philologist, grandchild of Otto Holmboe, brother of B.M.
 Arnold Holmboe (1873–1956), Norwegian politician, great-great-grandchild of Otto's first cousin
 Jørgen Holmboe (1902–1979), Norwegian-American meteorologist, great-grandson of Leonhard Christian Borchgrevink Holmboe

Other
 Knud Holmboe (1902–1931), Danish journalist and explorer
 Vagn Holmboe (1909–1996), Danish composer